Hadrothemis scabrifrons, commonly known as the red jungle-skimmer, is a species of dragonfly in the family Libellulidae. It is found in Kenya, Malawi, Mozambique, Tanzania, Zambia, and Zimbabwe. Its natural habitat is subtropical or tropical moist lowland forests. It is threatened by habitat loss due to rapid deforestation in the area due to agriculture and logging.

References

Sources

Libellulidae
Taxonomy articles created by Polbot
Insects described in 1910